was a Japanese Konkōkyō leader, calligrapher, poet, cultural leader, and educator.

Konkō founded the Konkō Library, and was the first library director. From 1954 to 1990, he advised the Japan Library Association. From 1973 to 1990 he advised the Boy Scouts of Nippon.

Hiroki Kōsai of Saji Observatory, who had a good relationship with him, named asteroid 4526 Konko  and 11254 Konkohekisui (18 February 1977  )in his honor.

Works 
 『生きる力の贈りもの』（金光教徒社、2001年）
 『土』1-19（槻の木叢書）

References

External links

Scouting in Japan
Konkōkyō people
1909 births
1991 deaths